Raymond Adeola (born 12 May 2001) is a Nigerian professional footballer, who plays as a midfielder for Rodina Moscow.

References

External links 
 
 

2001 births
People from Abuja
21st-century Nigerian people
Living people
Association football midfielders
FC Sucleia players
FC Gomel players
Belarusian Premier League players
Russian First League players
Nigerian footballers
Nigerian expatriate footballers
Expatriate footballers in Moldova
Nigerian expatriate sportspeople in Moldova
Expatriate footballers in Belarus
Nigerian expatriate sportspeople in Belarus
Expatriate footballers in Russia
Nigerian expatriate sportspeople in Russia